WMOR (1330 AM) was a radio station broadcasting an adult hits format, simulcasting WMOR-FM 106.1. Established in 1955, the station was licensed to serve Morehead, Kentucky, United States.  WMOR was owned by Morgan County Industries, Inc. and featured programming from ABC Radio. WMOR surrendered its license on April 11, 2017.

References

External links
FCC Station Search Details: DWMOR (Facility ID: 73280)
FCC History Cards for WMOR  (covering 1954-1979)

MOR
Radio stations established in 1955
1955 establishments in Kentucky
Radio stations disestablished in 2017
2017 disestablishments in Kentucky
Defunct radio stations in the United States
MOR
MOR